, translated to English as The Flower Child Lunlun and Lulu, The Flower Angel, is a magical girl anime by Toei Animation, focusing on a theme of flowers in its stories. It was directed by Hiroshi Shidara and written by Shiro Jinbo. It was greatly successful in the West, particularly in Europe and in Latin America, as well as in Japan. An edited English-language dub of a few episodes titled Angel made this series one of, if not the first, magical girl anime works to reach the United States and Canada, well over a decade before Sailor Moon.

A theatrical short film, was released in March 1980.

In 2009, William Winckler Productions produced two all-new English-dubbed movie versions edited from the original series titled Lun Lun the Flower Girl and Lun Lun the Flower Girl 2. Producer William Winckler, known for Tekkaman the Space Knight, wrote, produced and directed the English films, which are seen on broadband in Japan.

Story
Long ago, plant spirits and fairy-like creatures lived in harmony with mankind. Gradually humans began to rise toward greed and cruelty, and the plant spirits immigrated to another world they dubbed the "Flower Star." However, their legacy remained in people who truly knew the meaning of love and kindness. A talking dog and cat pair, Nouveau and Cateau, were sent to Earth to find one such person to find a magical flower — the symbol of the Flower Star's ruling family — so that a new ruler can ascend the throne.

In France they meet Lunlun Flower, a tomboyish and outspoken young orphan who lives with her paternal grandparents who own a flower shop. Lunlun's late mother turns out to be a descendant of the Flower star people, so at Lunlun's 15th birthday party they ask Lunlun to join them, and she accepts. They travel all over Europe in search of the flower, helping people every step of the way.

Lunlun, Nouveau and Cateau are followed by a bumbling pair of villains: the selfish fairy Togenishia and her servant Yabouki, who want to steal the flower and rule the Flower Star. Whenever Lunlun and her friends attempt to help people, Togenishia and Yabouki try to get them back on the road by force, only to fail. They're aided by Serge, a mysterious photographer who gives the people Lunlun helps packets of flower seeds which symbolize the lesson they've learned in the "language of flowers." (For instance, thistles, which signify independence, are given when the son of a farmer vows to follow his dreams and leave home). Lunlun develops a huge crush on Serge due to his kindness, and he's implied to like her back.

The people that Lunlun help send flower seeds to Lunlun's grandparents and tell them about their amazing granddaughter... and, in the end, the magical flower is found growing in his garden, and saving it from destruction after an attack from Togenishia. The photographer Serge turns out to be the prince of the Flower Star, and he confirms that he loves Lunlun and asks her to be his Queen. Lunlun rejects his proposal, however, since she loves Serge with all of her heart but does not want to live in the Star Flower. So Serge cedes the throne to his younger brother so he can live on Earth and marry Lunlun.

At the start of the series, Lunlun is given a magical pin from the King of the Flower Planet. This pin, when a flower is reflected in its mirror, gives Lunlun a new outfit for an activity, such as mountain climbing. About halfway through the series, the pin is broken when Lunlun falls from a branch overhanging a waterfall while trying to attract attention after being caught in the Dark Wind (Togenishia's main form of attack). While she is lost in the river, a new pin is given to her in the shape of the royal crest, with the warning that if it is ever lost or broken, her life on Earth will end and she will be unable to return to the Flower Planet. The words to activate this pin are "Fu Flay Lu Fey Lora".

Japanese Cast
Mari Okamoto as Lunlun
Fuyumi Shiraishi as Cateau
Takuzou Kamiyama as Nouveau
Yuu Mizushima as Serge Flora
Michie Kita as Togenishia
Natsuko Kawaji as Queen
Reiko Suzuki as Grandmother
Keaton Yamada as Grandfather
Tohru Furuya as Claude

International titles

 Flower Angel (English dub, U.K.; produced by Harmony Gold)
 Angel (English dub, U.S.; produced by ZIV International)
 Lulú, la Chica de las Flores or El Misterio de la Flor Mágica (Castilian Spanish dub)
 Ángel, la Niña de las Flores (Latin American Spanish dub)
 Angel, a Menina das Flores (Brazilian Portuguese dub)
 Angélica (Brazilian Portuguese alternative title dub)
 Le tour de monde de Lydie (French dub)
 Lulu l'angelo tra i fiori (Italian dub)
 Ейнджъл — детето на цветята (Bulgarian dub)
 Lidia in jurul lumii (Romanian dub)
 Лулу — ангел цветов (Russian dub)
 Lili, a virágangyal (Hungarian dub)
 Lulu, the Flower Girl (Indonesian sub)
 Lulu  (Filipino dub)
 Ronron the Flower Angel (English dub, Philippines)
 Saosan, Al Zahrah Al Jamilah (سوسن، الزهرة الجميلة)  (Arabic dub)
 Lulu i cudowny kwiat (Polish lector)
 Çiçek Kız (Turkish dub)
 꽃천사 루루 (Korean dub)
 花仙子 (Huaxianzi) (Mandarin dub)
 זהבית (Zehavit) (Hebrew dub)
 สาวน้อยแองเจิ้ล (Sao noi Angel) (Thai dub)
 Angel, das Blumenmädchen (German dub)
 Angel (Dutch dub; based on ZIV International's English dub)

English-language versions 
Initially, ZIV International acquired the series for the U.S. in 1980. At least the first four episodes were dubbed into English, with a new theme song and score by house composer Mark Mercury. In this incarnation, the characters were renamed to Angel (Lunlun), Cathy (Cateau), Wendal (Nouveau), Melicia (Togenishia) and Ivan (Yabouki). The episodes were then packaged into one presentation in 1981, which aired on HBO and was released on videocassette by Media Home Entertainment as Angel and by Family Home Entertainment as Flower Angel. The ZIV dub was released on DVD as part of the Fairy Tale Adventures compilation from TCG Direct in 2009.

In 1985, ZIV licensed their rights to Harmony Gold, who prepared a feature-film length condensation of the series with another new dub track and music score. Again, the characters were renamed, this time to Angel (Lunlun), Lily (Cateau), Periwinkle (Nouveau), Princess Wysteria (Togenishia), Ragweed (Yabouki) and Stefan (Serge Flora). The episodes that were featured in the film were episodes 1, 7, 24, 29, 49 and 50. The 37th episode was also covered, but it was only the intro to coincide with the beginning events of the 49th episode. This film was not released in America, but received multiple VHS releases in the UK.

Reception 

In 2005, Japanese television network TV Asahi conducted an online web poll for the top 100 anime, and Hana no Ko Lunlun placed 85th tied with Ikkyū-san.

References

External links
Official site by Toei 

1979 anime television series debuts
1980 anime films
Japanese animated films
Magical girl anime and manga
Shōjo manga
Toei Animation television
TV Asahi original programming
Toei Animation films